Amit Trivedi (born 8 April 1979) is an Indian  music director, singer, film scorer, composer, music producer and lyricist who works primarily in Hindi films. After working as a theatre and jingle composer and composing for non-film albums, he debuted as a film composer in the 2008 Hindi film Aamir, he gained prominence for his work in the Hindi film Dev.D (2009).

Early life
Trivedi was born in Bandra, Mumbai. Growing up, his only connect with music was devotional songs and Gujarati folk. His native city is Ahmedabad, Gujarat.

Career
In his younger days, an electronic musical instrument fascinated Trivedi and he was slowly drawn towards music, mainly influenced by classical music. At 19–20, he began composing music. In college days, he joined the band Om, who performed at local gigs, small shows and live performances. They struck gold when Times Music took notice at one of their shows, and offered to launch their album. The album however did not fare well, due to lack of promotion. Eventually Trivedi went on to compose for theatre (Hindi, English and Gujarati plays), background music for television shows, programming for some Marathi films, live performances, dandiya shows, orchestras etc. He also had a brief stint composing advertisement jingles, for brands such as McDonald's and Airtel. After sound engineer and Audio Garage Recording Studio owner Arvind Vishwakarma introduced Trivedi to Sony BMG, he began composing music for non-film albums. As a part of his two-year contract, Trivedi composed some tracks for Abhijeet Sawant's Junoon and one song in Prashant Tamang's debut album. He arranged for many musicians including Amartya Rahut for a Marathi film Uttarayan in 2004.

Film music eventually came his way, when friend and playback singer Shilpa Rao suggested his name to film director Anurag Kashyap. The latter was in search of a new composer with a distinct vision for his next film. After meeting Trivedi, Kashyap offered him the chance to compose the soundtrack to Dev.D. Although it was scheduled to be his debut, Dev.D ran into production delays and was shelved for some time.

Upon Kashyap's recommendation, Trivedi was roped in to score Raj Kumar Gupta's directorial venture Aamir. Trivedi and Gupta worked on making the soundtrack fuse with the film narrative, resulting in an effort that garnered critical recognition.

By the end of 2008, Dev.D was finally released. The soundtrack, released in December, consisted of 18 tracks of different genres. Trivedi dubbed the soundtrack the "baap (father) of different genres". He sang five songs on the soundtrack, and wrote the lyrics for one ("Aankh Micholi"). He shot to fame with the unusual music of Dev.D, giving many chartbusters like "Emosanal Attyachar", "Saali Khushi", "O Pardesi" and many more. He was conferred with both the R. D. Burman Award and the Best Background Score at the Filmfare Awards 2010, before receiving the National Film Award for Best Music Direction, the highest recognition for Indian composers. Trivedi wrote the score for Wake Up Sid (2009) and one of his compositions "Iktara" was also included in the soundtrack. In 2009 itself, Trivedi was roped in by Anshu Sharma to compose the team anthem "Game for More" for Royal Challengers Bangalore, a team owned by liquor baron Vijay Mallya. Between scoring for films, Trivedi also wrote the title track for the reality show Big Switch aired on UTV Bindaas. He also provided the music and background score for the ensemble romantic comedy-drama Aisha (2010), which also had him providing vocals for two songs, "Suno Aisha" and "Sham". Recently, he won Best Song for "Naina Da Kya Kasoor" at the News18 Reel Movie Awards from Andhadhun (2018). Apart from "Naina Da Kya Kasoor", he also sang "Laila Laila" for the film. In 2019, Power Brands honored him with the Best Music Director of the Year award for Andhadhun at the Bollywood Film Journalists Awards (BFJA).

Trivedi was the composer of the official anthem for the 2021 ICC Men's T20 World Cup, which was backed by lyricist Kausar Munir and sung by Sharvi Yadav and Anand Bhaskar. An Indipop song, he also makes the use of vocal orchestra therein.

He has made TV appearances for various shows aired on MTV. Also, he composed title track for the television show Aaj Ki Raat Hai Zindagi, hosted by Amitabh Bachchan. He also composed music for the 2018 film Kedarnath produced by RSVP Movies and Guy in The Sky Pictures.

Live performance
Amit Trivedi shared stage along with the likes of Katy Perry, Dua Lipa, Ritviz and The Local Train at OnePlus Music Festival. There was a Coke Studio concert at IIM Bangalore on 22 November 2013, featuring Amit Trivedi along with Tochi Raina, Shriram Iyer, Tanvi Shah, Mili Nair and Jaggi. He also performed for the Bacardi NH7 Weekender (music festival) which happened in Pune, Delhi, and Hyderabad. In January 2016, he performed at Quo Vadis, the annual fest of Indian Institute of Foreign Trade, Delhi. On 1 February 2016, he performed at Spring Fest, the annual festival of IIT Kharagpur along with the likes of Neeti Mohan, Yashita Sharma and Divya Kumar. He performed at Chembur Gymkhana on 4 March 2017. He performed on 19 March 2017 at Gujarat National Law University, Gandhinagar. On 26 March 2017, he performed along with Jonita Gandhi and Divya Kumar at Aura, the annual festival of Gogte Institute of Technology. He also composed a nation song incorporating all his popular genres and celebrating unity through an amalgamation of folk music from different states of the nation at the Mirchi Music Awards held in 2017. On 20 January 2018; he performed for the first time in Navi Mumbai at SIESONS, SIES College (Nerul) with Jonita Gandhi, Shashwat Singh, Arun Kumar and Yashita Sharma. He has also performed in "Kashiyatra" IIT BHU Annual Fest on 21 January 2018; the very next day. He performed at K. J. Somaiya College of Engineering for their annual cultural festival Symphony on 7 February 2018, and his performance also included the launch and first-ever live performance of Padman's title track 'Aaj Se Teri'. He also performed in "Engifest", the Delhi Technological University Annual Fest on 16 February 2018. He also performed in "Riviera" in VIT University on 17 February 2018. He performed in Synapse (Gujarat's largest cultural fest) at DA-IICT, Gandhinagar on 24 February. He performed at the Hindu College for their fest "Mecca" on 16 March. In October 2018 he also performed at the annual cultural fest of IIT Roorkee,"Thomso". His performance at IIT Indore during Fluxus - Annual Techno-Cultural fest of IIT Indore on 17 February 2019 was highly appreciated by the crowd and considered one of his best live performances. He performed at the Vibrance 2019 (VIT Chennai's annual cultural fest) on 21 February. He also performed recently at BITS Pilani for their cultural fest "Oasis" on 22 November 2022. He is currently managed by Tarsame Mittal Talent Management for his live shows.

Discography

As composer

As playback singer

National Film Awards
National Film Awards

Filmfare Awards
Filmfare Awards

Star Screen Awards
Star Screen Awards

Zee Cine Awards
Zee Cine Awards

Mirchi Music Awards
Mirchi Music Awards

Global Indian Music Academy Awards
Global Indian Music Academy Awards

Stardust Awards
Stardust Awards

Giffoni Film Festival
Giffoni Film Festival

South Indian International Movie Awards
South Indian International Movie Awards

==References==

External links

 
 Q & A With Amit Trivedi – The Composer of Dev.D
 The making of Dev.D- Emosional Atyachar
 Udaan, Background Score

1979 births
Living people
Musicians from Mumbai
Bollywood playback singers
Indian lyricists
Gujarati people
Indian pop composers
Filmfare Awards winners
Best Music Direction National Film Award winners
Hindi film score composers
Telugu playback singers
Telugu film score composers